

This is a list of the National Register of Historic Places listings in Greene County, Illinois.

This is intended to be a complete list of the properties and districts on the National Register of Historic Places in Greene County, Illinois, United States. Latitude and longitude coordinates are provided for many National Register properties and districts; these locations may be seen together in a map.

There are 12 properties and districts listed on the National Register in the county.

Current listings

|}

See also

 List of National Historic Landmarks in Illinois
 National Register of Historic Places listings in Illinois

References

 
Greene County